Eupithecia venulata is a moth in the family Geometridae. It is found in Peru.

The wingspan is about 22 mm. The forewings are grey. The lines and markings are more brownish grey, the darker lines and paler intervals forming alternating light and dark dashes on the veins. The hindwing markings are only shown on the inner margin, the costal half 
of wing being whitish.

References

Moths described in 1907
venulata
Moths of South America